Reingsen is a part of Ergste, a district of Schwerte, Germany. Before 1975, Reingsen belongs to the county Iserlohn (Kreis Iserlohn). At 2012 Reingsen had a population of 110 inhabitants. It lies south of the river Ruhr near Sauerland and is mainly used for agriculture.

Geology 
In Reingsen there are two streams, the Lollenbach and the Reingser Bach.

References

External links 
 openstreetmap.org

Unna (district)
Geography of North Rhine-Westphalia